is an airport on the island of Tokunoshima, located in the town of  Amagi, Ōshima District, Kagoshima Prefecture of Japan.

History
Tokunoshima Airport was opened on 23 February 1962 as a private venture by Toa Domestic Airlines with a 1080-meter runway. The airport was turned over to Kagoshima Prefecture on 24 October 1970, and was designed a 3rd class airport by the Japanese government on 27 February 1973. The runway was extended to 1200 meters on 1 June 1973, and to 2000 meters on 1 June 1980, becoming the first amongst Kagoshima’s offshore airports to be capable of handling jet aircraft operations.

In 2010, Prime Minister Yukio Hatoyama offered the use of Tokunoshima to the United States as a relocation site for Marine Corps Air Station Futenma, leading to widespread protests.

Airlines and destinations

References

Yeo, Andrew. Activists, Alliances, and Anti-U.S. Base Protests. Cambridge University Press. (2011)

External links

RJKN Tokunoshima Airport Guide from Japan Airlines
 

Airports in Kagoshima Prefecture